The black lizardfish or deep-water greeneye, Bathysauropsis gracilis, is a grinner of the genus Bathysauropsis, found around the world in the southern oceans, at depths between 1,500 and 3,000 m.  Its length is from 20 to 30 cm.

References
 
 
 Tony Ayling & Geoffrey Cox, Collins Guide to the Sea Fishes of New Zealand,  (William Collins Publishers Ltd, Auckland, New Zealand 1982) 

Aulopiformes
Fish described in 1878
Taxa named by Albert Günther